ChiWriter is a commercial scientific text editor for MS-DOS, created by Cay Horstmann in 1986.  It was one of the first WYSIWYG editors that could write mathematical formulæ, even on IBM PC XT computers that were then common.

The editor was more oriented to speed and interactive aspect of editing, rather than on visual appearance of the result, therefore, it has its own graphical user interface with bitmap fonts of fixed width. Although popular (easier to use than TeX for many scientists), this led to its demise as more text editors with vector fonts for Microsoft Windows began to appear, and in 1996, it has been discontinued.

The basic idea of ChiWriter is that a user can add lines above or below the current text line (by half of the base line height), and write text there too. The additional lines are treated as part of the original text line. This can be used to create subscripts and superscripts, and also more complex formulae such as fractions. Combined with the possibility to use several fonts (up to 20) at once, such as Greek alphabet, Cyrillic alphabets, and mathematical and other symbols, ChiWriter is quite easy to write mathematical texts in. Every font has the same fixed dimensions, but you can use different sets for different output devices (for example, you can use low-resolution fonts for screen and high-resolution fonts for printers). You can also manually create larger objects (such as sums and integrals) by using several symbols for each part of the object.

The editor was quite customizable. There was also a font editor, which allowed to modify fonts and introduce user-designed fonts (including proportional ones) and symbols.

Recently people experience some difficulty with exhibiting ChiWriter documents. A simple solution takes into consideration the fact that in the quality printing mode ChiWriter outputs bit-image print codes which can be redirected into a file (default extension .bin). In the heydays of the editor, the codes Epson ESC/P were the most frequently used. Utility chipbm converts used by ChiWriter subset of bit-image print codes into a file Portable anymap (.pbm) which is loaded by many graphical utilities. For example, utility GIMP allows saving a page afterwards in Portable Document Format (.pdf). 

It is still possible to run the application on modern computers, using DOS virtualization software, like VirtualBox or DosBox. This allows to convert the documents into the PostScript format (.ps), using the provided PostScript printer driver. PostScript format can be directly converted into Portable Document Format (.pdf) format.

External links
 .
 ChiWriter and user applications

1986 software
DOS text editors